Beverly Huston Sgro (January 12, 1941 – March 13, 2020) was an American educator who served as Virginia Secretary of Education under Governor George Allen.

References

External links
 Virginia Secretary of Education

1941 births
2020 deaths
State cabinet secretaries of Virginia
Women in Virginia politics
21st-century American women